This is a list of notable schools located in the African country of Eswatini.

Mbabane 
 St Mark's School
 Waterford Kamhlaba
 Sifundzani High School

See also 

 Education in Eswatini
 Lists of schools

References 

Schools
Schools
Eswatini
Eswatini

Schools